The Rubik Monastery Church is a monastery church in Rubik, Lezhë County, Albania. It is a Cultural Monument of Albania. It was built in 1166 AD.

References

Cultural Monuments of Albania
Buildings and structures in Mirditë
Roman Catholic churches in Albania